The 2020 Constitutional Democratic Party of Japan leadership election was held on 10 September 2020. It was won by Yukio Edano.

Candidates 

 Yukio Edano
 Kenta Izumi

References 

Elections in Japan
Political party leadership elections in Japan
2020 elections in Japan
September 2020 events in Japan